Emergency Fire Response (a.k.a. In this game, the player takes control of a team of firefighters from the fictional Fire Station 615. There are more than thirty missions within nine scenarios, each featuring different challenges which must be met with a range of different tactics.

In this game, the player is able to take advantage of the individual talents of each member of his firefighting team.  These include paramedics, High Risk Environment Specialists, and Technical Officers. Players can also use a number of different support vehicles, including ambulances and ladder trucks, to help complete missions. Players are also able to choose the appearance of their firefighting units based on the different appearances of firefighters in different parts of the world, but this does not change the overall experience of the game.

Sequels
Two sequels have been made: Fire Department 2 (a.k.a. Firefighter Command Raging Inferno in North America) and Fire Department 3.

See also
Emergency (video game series)

References

External links
 

2003 video games
Emergency simulation
Embracer Group franchises
Video games about firefighting
Video games developed in France
Windows games
Windows-only games
DreamCatcher Interactive games